"Spring Lament" is a five-word jueju poem written by Jin Changxu during the late Tang dynasty. This is historically the only poem attributed to him. It is a notable example of the genre as it clearly illustrates various important techniques associated with jueju. The poem is about a woman longing for her husband who is on a far away campaign in Liaoxi.

Poem

Critical analysis
The words and expressions in the poem are lively like that in folk songs and stitched tightly together, with the images one after another. The resulting four-line poem is a single cohesive unit which cannot be separated. In composing five-word jueju verse, there are two types. One type is "one line one concept". Du Fu was the master of this type, where each line can stand on its own. The other is "one poem one concept", where every line is critical to the central vision presented by the poem.

Read as two couplets, the first couplet is about oriole songs. The second couplet turns the subject to the woman. This change in focus beginning with the third line is another "rule" for five-word jueju.

From another viewpoint, the central meaning of the poem is revealed layer by layer as each line is read. Each line raises a question which is answered in the next. That line in turn raises another question, and so on. This poetic technique is known as "sweep and renew". As each line sweeps away a question, it presents a new one.

The first line raises the question "why hit the orioles' perch"? After all, it is a happy sign of spring. The second line answers to stop the singing. But that raises another question, why? Most people like the orioles' singing. The third line tells of the interrupted dream, but why is it important? The last line gives the final answer; she was going to see her husband in her now lost dream. Yet that final answer raises larger questions. What kind of quest sends her man so far away to Liaoxi, beginning of the Silk Road? what of the Emperor who sets such a quest? and what is the ultimate meaning of such a quest? The reader is left to ponder such questions.

References 
 Beckwith, Christopher I. (2009): Empires of the Silk Road: A History of Central Eurasia from the Bronze Age to the Present. Princeton: Princeton University Press. .
 
 
 
 

Tang dynasty poetry
Chinese poetry collections
Chinese poetry forms